The Abductors is a 1957 American film noir crime film directed by Andrew McLaglen and starring Victor McLaglen, George Macready and Gavin Muir. It was produced by Regal Films.

Maury Dexter described the film as "not too hot" but liked McLaglen's work enough to hire him as director on The Little Shepherd of Kingdom Come.

Plot
Illinois, 1876: Tom Muldoon turns up in the capital city of Springfield, telling an old acquaintance, undertaker John Langley, that he has just gotten out of prison in Joliet. He shows Langley a new $50 bill created by a counterfeiter who had been his cellmate.

Muldoon proposes a scheme. The counterfeiter has hidden $100,000 in counterfeit currency, plus the engraving plates that can make more. But he is serving a life sentence, so Muldoon's idea is to kidnap the warden's daughter and trade her for the counterfeiter's release.

Langley agrees and persuades his partner Herbert Evans, mortuary employee Jed and niece Carol Ann to be accomplices. They find the warden's daughter working in a Chicago mission. Together they take the young woman hostage, but a carriage accident permits her to escape.

Desperately needing a new plan, Muldoon suggests becoming grave robbers, stealing the body Abraham Lincoln from its Springfield resting place. Evans, an admirer of Lincoln, objects and Muldoon murders him. Secret Service agent Fred Winters is tipped off that a crime is in progress. After the criminals discover Lincoln's tomb to be impenetrable, Muldoon is killed by a frightened horse. Langley gets 20 years in prison, also discovering that the counterfeiter's ruse was a lie.

Cast
 Victor McLaglen as Tom Muldoon
 George Macready as Jack Langley
 Gavin Muir as Herbert Evans
 Fay Spain as The Girl 
 Carl Thayler as The Boy
 John Morley as Officers of the Law 
 Carlyle Mitchell as Officers of the Law 
 George Cisar as Officers of the Law 
 Jason Johnson as Officers of the Law
 Pat Lawless as Officers of the Law 
 James Logan as Officers of the Law 
 Fintan Meyler as Citizens of Springfield and Chicago 
 Joseph Hamilton as Citizens of Springfield and Chicago (as Joe Hamilton) 
 Nolan Leary as Citizens of Springfield and Chicago 
 Gene Walker as Citizens of Springfield and Chicago 
 Calvin Booth as Citizens of Springfield and Chicago 
 Cliff Lyons as Citizens of Springfield and Chicago

Production
The film was based on a US Secret Service paper called The Attempted Theft of President Lincoln's Body about a real life attempt to steal Lincoln's corpse that took place on 27 October 1876 in Oakridge Cemetery, Springfield Illinois. Writer-producer Ray Wander said he heard about the story while working with Mark Stevens on Washington on Big Time for TV. He secured permission to dig out evidence at the Library of Congress.

The film was announced in February 1957.

Andrew McLaglen said he "loved" directing his father. "I made the picture in ten days. He just did it as a favour for me." He would also direct his father in episodes of Rawhide and Have Gun Will Travel.

References

External links
 

1957 films
20th Century Fox films
CinemaScope films
Film noir
Films directed by Andrew McLaglen
1950s English-language films